Annur is a town panchayat and taluk headquarters of Annur Taluk of Coimbatore district.

Annur may also refer to:

 Annur Sree Mahavishnu Temple
 Annur Block
 Annur taluk
 Annur mosque (disambiguation)